HMS Trident was a 64-gun third rate ship of the line of the Royal Navy, launched on 20 April 1768 at Portsmouth.
On 30 January 1772 in Gibraltar harbour during a severe winter storm the Danish ship-of-the-line Prinsesse Wilhelmine Caroline dragged its anchor, colliding with the bow of HMS Trident before running aground.

From April until June 1778 she was under the command of John Inglis.

For some of the period between 1793 and 1796, she was under the command of Captain Theophilus Jones.

Trident was sold out of the navy in 1816.

Notes

References

Lavery, Brian (2003) The Ship of the Line - Volume 1: The development of the battlefleet 1650-1850. Conway Maritime Press. .

Citations
T. A. Topsøe-Jensen og Emil Marquard (1935) “Officerer i den dansk-norske Søetat 1660-1814 og den danske Søetat 1814-1932“. Two volumes. Download Volume 1 and Volume 2.

Ships of the line of the Royal Navy
Exeter-class ships of the line
1768 ships